Ricardo Adán Jiménez de Alba (born 17 November 1984 in Guadalajara) is a former Mexican professional footballer who last played for Atlante in the Ascenso MX.

External links
 
 
 atlantefc.com.mx
 
 

1984 births
Living people
Mexico under-20 international footballers
Footballers from Guadalajara, Jalisco
Atlas F.C. footballers
Chiapas F.C. footballers
Atlante F.C. footballers
San Luis F.C. players
Mexican footballers
Association football central defenders